G.I. Joe is a line of military-themed action figures produced by Hasbro.

G.I. Joe may also refer to:
 G.I. Joe: A Real American Hero, a toyline that lasted from 1982 to 1994
 G.I. Joe Team, the elite military group portrayed in the toyline, comic books and cartoon series
 General Joseph Colton, a fictional character also known as the original G.I. Joe
 G.I. Joe, a slang name for an ordinary American soldier; see G.I. (military)

Comic books
 G.I. Joe (comics), chronicling G.I. Joe from 1942 through the present
 G.I. Joe (IDW Publishing), a series of comic books by IDW Publishing
 G.I. Joe: A Real American Hero (Marvel Comics), based on the toyline
 G.I. Joe: A Real American Hero (Devil's Due), a continuation of the Marvel Comics series
 G.I. Joe: America's Elite, a continuation of the series by Devil's Due Publishing

Films
 The Story of G.I. Joe, a 1945 movie about US soldiers fighting in Italy during World War II
 G.I. Joe: The Movie, 1987 full-length animated movie
 G.I. Joe: Spy Troops, a 2003 direct-to-DVD CGI-animated movie
 G.I. Joe: Valor vs. Venom, a 2004 sequel to Spy Troops
 G.I. Joe (film series), live-action films based upon G.I. Joe
 G.I. Joe: The Rise of Cobra, a 2009 live-action movie
 G.I. Joe: Retaliation, a 2013 sequel to the 2009 film
 Snake Eyes: G.I. Joe Origins, a 2021 G.I. Joe spin-off film centered around the character of Snake Eyes

Television
 G.I. Joe: A Real American Hero (1983 TV series), original Sunbow-produced animated series from 1983 to 1986
 G.I. Joe: A Real American Hero (1989 TV series), DiC animated series running from 1989 to 1992
 G.I. Joe Extreme, animated series which ran from 1995 to 1997
 G.I. Joe: Sigma 6, 2005 animated series
 G.I. Joe: Resolute, 2009 animated series
 G.I. Joe: Renegades, 2010 animated series

Video games
 G.I. Joe: Cobra Strike, 1983 by Parker Brothers for the Atari 2600 and Intellivision
 G.I. Joe: A Real American Hero (video game), 1985 by Epyx for the Apple II and the Commodore 64
 G.I. Joe (NES video game), 1991 by Taxan for the Nintendo Entertainment System
 G.I. Joe (arcade game), 1992 by Konami
 G.I. Joe: The Atlantis Factor, 1992 by Capcom for the Nintendo Entertainment System
 G.I. Joe: The Rise of Cobra (video game), 2009 by Electronic Arts, based on the movie

Other uses
 G.I. Joe (pigeon), a pigeon noted for his service during World War II

See also
 List of G.I. Joe series
 List of G.I. Joe video games
 G.I. Joe's, a defunct sports and auto retailer from 1952 to 2007
 GI Jill, radio host for Armed Forces Radio Network during World War II